Bherjan Bokajan Padumoni Wildlife Sanctuary is a protected area located in Tinsukia district of Assam located in India covering 7.22 km2. This wildlife sanctuary is spread across three blocks located in Tinsukia district of Upper Assam which consist of three separate forests, namely Bherjan, Borajan and Padumoni. It is a very important forest in terms of conservation and includes habitat for animals such as hoolock gibbon, capped langur, pig-tailed macaque, slow loris, rhesus macaque, leopard, etc.

84 species of birds were recorded here.

See also
 Protected areas of Assam

References

External links
 Bherjan - Borajan - Padumoni Wildlife Sanctuaries at wildmahseer.com.

Wildlife sanctuaries in Assam
Tinsukia district
Protected areas with year of establishment missing